David Lindo was a English Sephardi communal worker and elder of Bevis Marks Synagogue. 

He was the son of Elias Lindo (1740-1785), a royal exchange broker, and Grace Lumbroso de Mattos, the daughter of Moses Lumbroso de Mattos (1700-59).

David was an uncle of Benjamin Disraeli and he carried out his circumcision.  He was an uncle by marriage of Moses Montefiore. 

He opposed the founders of the Reform movement in London. Lindo had at least eighteen children, many of whom married into well established Sephardi families.

Parnas of Bevis Marks Synagogue several times between 1809-38.

References 

English Sephardi Jews
19th-century Sephardi Jews
1772 births

1852 deaths